Tadas Babelis (born 25 February 1997) is a Lithuanian tennis player.

Babelis has a career high ATP singles ranking of 1316 achieved on 1 May 2017. He also has a career high ATP doubles ranking of 803 achieved on 29 October 2018.

Babelis represents Lithuania at the Davis Cup, where he has a W/L record of 1–7.

Future and Challenger finals

Doubles 2 (2–0)

Davis Cup

Participations: (1–7)

   indicates the outcome of the Davis Cup match followed by the score, date, place of event, the zonal classification and its phase, and the court surface.

External links
 
 
 
 

1997 births
Living people
Lithuanian male tennis players
NC State Wolfpack men's tennis players
21st-century Lithuanian people